The 1946 Bowling Green Falcons football team was an American football team that represented Bowling Green State College (later renamed Bowling Green State University) as an independent during the 1946 college football season. In its sixth season under head coach Robert Whittaker, the team compiled a 5–3 record and outscored opponents by a total of 95 to 39. Wayne Bordner and  Stanley Yoder were the team captains. The team played its home games at University Stadium in Bowling Green, Ohio.

Schedule

References

Bowling Green
Bowling Green Falcons football seasons
Bowling Green Falcons football